Noordin Bridge is the main bridge in Perak Tengah district, Perak, Malaysia. It is located on Federal Route 73 crossing Perak River between Belanja and Parit.

Bridges in Perak
Perak Tengah District